Aeromonas rivuli is a Gram-negative, oxidase- and catalase-positive, non-spore-forming bacterium with a polar flagellum of the genus Aeromonas isolated from Westerhöfer Bach in Harz in Germany.

References

External links
Type strain of Aeromonas rivuli at BacDive -  the Bacterial Diversity Metadatabase

Aeromonadales
Bacteria described in 2011